Roger Kluge (born 5 February 1986) is a German professional racing cyclist, who currently rides for UCI Continental team . Kluge left  at the end of the 2013 season, and joined  for the 2014 season. At the 2008 Summer Olympics, he won the silver medal in the men's points race.

Major results

Track

2003
 National Junior Championships
2nd Keirin
3rd Team sprint
2004
 2nd Madison, National Junior Championships
2005
 3rd Munich, UIV Cup
2006
 UIV Cup
1st Copenhagen
2nd Ghent
3rd Bremen
 2nd Points, National Championships
 3rd  Madison, UEC European Under-23 Championships
2007
 National Championships
1st  Points
2nd Team pursuit
2nd Madison
 UCI World Cup Classics
1st Scratch, Sydney
2nd Scratch, Manchester
 2nd  Scratch, UEC European Under-23 Championships
 2nd Rotterdam, UIV Cup
2008
 2nd  Points, Olympic Games
 2nd Six Days of Grenoble (with Olaf Pollack)
 3rd Madison (with Olaf Pollack), UCI World Cup Classics, Los Angeles
 3rd Six Days of Munich (with Olaf Pollack)
2009
 1st  Madison, UEC European Championships
 National Championships
1st  Madison (with Olaf Pollack)
1st  Team pursuit
2nd Points
 1st Six Days of Amsterdam (with Robert Bartko)
 2nd Six Days of Ghent (with Iljo Keisse)
 3rd Six Days of Berlin (with Kenny De Ketele)
2010
 1st  Omnium, UEC European Championships
 1st Six Days of Amsterdam (with Robert Bartko)
 2nd Six Days of Berlin (with Robert Bartko)
2011
 1st Six Days of Berlin (with Robert Bartko)
2012
 1st  Individual pursuit, National Championships
 2nd Six Days of Zürich (with Danilo Hondo)
2013
 1st  Team pursuit, National Championships
 1st Six Days of Berlin (with Peter Schep)
2015
 1st  Omnium, National Championships
2016
 2nd  Omnium, UCI World Championships
 2nd Six Days of Berlin (with Marcel Kalz)
2017
 1st Six Days of Rotterdam (with Christian Grasmann)
2018
 1st  Madison (with Theo Reinhardt), UCI World Championships
 3rd Six Days of London (with Theo Reinhardt)
2019
 1st  Madison (with Theo Reinhardt), UCI World Championships
 1st Six Days of Berlin (with Theo Reinhardt)
2021
 2nd Six Days of Ghent (with Jasper De Buyst)
2022
 1st Six Days of Berlin (with Theo Reinhardt)
 2nd  Points, UCI World Championships

Road

2007
 1st  Overall Brandenburg Rundfahrt
1st Stage 2
 2nd Berlin–Bad Freienwald–Berlin
 2nd Fyen Rundt
 2nd Prague–Karlovy Vary–Prague
 3rd Rund um den Schäferberg
2008
 1st Stage 1 Mainfranken-Tour
 4th Overall Course de Solidarność et des Champions Olympiques
 9th Overall Tour de Berlin
1st Stage 4
2009
 Course de Solidarność et des Champions Olympiques
1st Stages 2 & 4
 1st Stage 4 Tour de Serbie
 National Championships
3rd Road race
5th Time trial
 9th Overall Bałtyk–Karkonosze Tour
1st Stage 6
2010
 1st Neuseen Classics
 4th Overall Tour of Qatar
1st  Young rider classification
 5th Time trial, National Championships
 10th Nokere Koerse
2011
 4th Overall Delta Tour Zeeland
 5th Road race, National Championships
 5th Binche–Chimay–Binche
2012
 3rd Clásica de Almería
2013
 5th Velothon Berlin
 7th Rund um Köln
 10th Overall Driedaagse van West-Vlaanderen
 10th Grote Prijs Stad Zottegem
2015
 1st Prologue Ster ZLM Toer
 4th Overall Bay Classic Series
2016
 1st Stage 17 Giro d'Italia
 6th Overall Ster ZLM Toer
2017
 10th Arnhem–Veenendaal Classic
2020
 9th Race Torquay
2022
 9th Memorial Rik Van Steenbergen

Grand Tour general classification results timeline

References

External links
 
 
 
 
 
 
 
 
 Roger Kluge on Mitchelton-Scott

1986 births
Living people
Sportspeople from Eisenhüttenstadt
People from Bezirk Frankfurt
German track cyclists
German male cyclists
Olympic cyclists of Germany
Cyclists at the 2008 Summer Olympics
Cyclists at the 2012 Summer Olympics
Cyclists at the 2016 Summer Olympics
Cyclists at the 2020 Summer Olympics
Olympic silver medalists for Germany
Olympic medalists in cycling
Medalists at the 2008 Summer Olympics
German Giro d'Italia stage winners
UCI Track Cycling World Champions (men)
Cyclists from Brandenburg
21st-century German people